The Skeleton mixed team competition at the IBSF World Championships 2023 was held on 29 January 2023.

Results
The race was started at 08:04.

References

Mixed Skeleton